Eulepetopsis is a genus of sea snails, the true limpets, marine gastropod mollusks in the family Neolepetopsidae.

Species
Species within the genus Eulepetopsis include:

 Eulepetopsis vitrea McLean, 1990

References

Neolepetopsidae
Monotypic gastropod genera